The 2022–23 Fehérvár FC season is the club's 82nd season in existence and the 24th consecutive season in the top flight of Hungarian football. In addition to the domestic league, Fehérvár are participating in this season's editions of the Hungarian Cup and the inaugural UEFA Conference League.

Transfers

Summer

In:

Out:

Source:

Winter

In:

Out:

Source:

Competitions

Overview

Nemzeti Bajnokság I

League table

Results summary

Results by round

Matches

Hungarian Cup

UEFA Conference League

Second qualifying round

Third qualifying round

Play-off round

Statistics

Appearances and goals
Last updated on 12 March 2023.

|-
|colspan="14"|Youth players:

|-
|colspan="14"|Out to loan:
|-
|colspan="14"|Players no longer at the club:

|}

Top scorers
Includes all competitive matches. The list is sorted by shirt number when total goals are equal.
Last updated on 12 March 2023

Disciplinary record
Includes all competitive matches. Players with 1 card or more included only.

Last updated on 12 March 2023

Clean sheets
Last updated on 12 March 2023

References

External links 
 Official Website
 Fixtures and results

Fehérvár FC seasons
Fehervar FC
Fehervar FC